Robert L. Corbin (December 8, 1922 – February 22, 2013) was a member of the Ohio House of Representatives from 1977 to 2000. He was born in Appleton, Wisconsin in 1922 before moving to Ohio in 1923. His family settled in Dayton, Ohio in 1929. He served in the United States Army in Europe during World War II. After his military service he received his bachelor's degree from Otterbein College and worked in the food service business. He served on the Centerville, Ohio city council 2002–2006. His district consisted of a portion of Montgomery County, Ohio. He was succeeded by John White.

He died in 2013 at the age of 90.

References

1922 births
2013 deaths
Businesspeople from Ohio
Republican Party members of the Ohio House of Representatives
Ohio city council members
Otterbein University alumni
Politicians from Appleton, Wisconsin
People from Dayton, Ohio
United States Army personnel of World War II
People from Centerville, Ohio
20th-century American businesspeople